Kathleen Smith (1948/49 – 31 May 2017) was an Australian politician who served in the New South Wales Legislative Assembly as the member for Gosford for the Labor Party from 2015 to 2017.

Smith was previously the chairwoman of Cancer Voices NSW, and has worked with organisations including the Consumers Health Forum, Medicines Australia, and Cancer Institute of NSW. She was also a member of the Palmer United Party before being selected as the Labor candidate for the seat of Gosford in the 2015 election.

On 14 February 2017, Smith announced that a cancer she had previously been treated for had metastasised, and she would resign from parliament to undergo further treatment. She died on 31 May 2017.

References

Year of birth missing
2017 deaths
Members of the New South Wales Legislative Assembly
Australian Labor Party members of the Parliament of New South Wales
English emigrants to Australia
People from Sheffield
21st-century Australian politicians
21st-century Australian women politicians
Deaths from cancer in New South Wales
Women members of the New South Wales Legislative Assembly